The New Vagrants can refer to:
The modern vagrants of the world.
The current "reincarnation" of the 1960s rock group, The Vagrants